

Military branches flags

Military personal flags

See also 

 List of Estonian flags

References

External links

Flags of Estonia
Lists and galleries of flags
Flags